Pakistan competed at several editions of the World Games.

In 2001, Shokat Ali won the bronze medal in the in snooker at the 2001 World Games in Akita, Japan.

Medal count

References 

 
Nations at the World Games